The Savage Eye is a 1959 "dramatized documentary" film that superposes a dramatic narration of the life of a divorced woman with documentary camera footage of Los Angeles. The film was written, produced, directed, and edited by Ben Maddow, Sidney Meyers, and Joseph Strick, who did the work over several years on their weekends. The Savage Eye is often considered to be part of the cinema vérité movement of the 1950s and 1960s.

Production

Benjamin Jackson has noted that Irving Lerner, Strick's collaborator on the earlier documentary Muscle Beach (1948), "was part of the original group, but left in the middle of production." The camera footage for the film was shot over four years by the principal cinematographers Haskell Wexler, Helen Levitt, and Jack Couffer; the sound editing for the film was one of Verna Fields' early credits. Barbara Baxley enacted the role of divorcée Judith X, while Gary Merrill was the male narrator who voiced her angel, her double: "That vial dreamer, your conscience."

Exhibition
The film premiered at the Edinburgh Film Festival in August 1959 and received the Roy Thomson Edinburgh Film Guild Award; at the Venice Film Festival, it took the Italian Film Clubs Prize. It also won the 1959 BAFTA Robert Flaherty Award for Best Feature Length Documentary. Reviewing its debut at the Edinburgh Film Festival, the art critic David Sylvester called its imagery "sharp, intense, spectacular, and imaginative".

The film opened commercially in New York City on June 6, 1960. In his The New York Times review, A. H. Weiler characterized the film: 

John Hagan has written further of the film's influence that: "One can see how, in its study of a woman whose marital problems have estranged her from the world, it anticipated, if not influenced, such films as The Misfits, Red Desert, and Juliet of the Spirits."

The Academy Film Archive preserved The Savage Eye in 2008.

References

External links

1960 films
1960 documentary films
American documentary films
Films scored by Leonard Rosenman
Films directed by Sidney Meyers
Films directed by Joseph Strick
Films set in the 1950s
1960s English-language films
1960s American films